Kuzma Venediktovich Kiselyov (1 November 1903 – 4 May 1977) was a Soviet and Byelorussian diplomat, statesman, and politician. From 15 March 1946 to 14 May 1966, he served as the first Minister of Foreign Affairs of the Byelorussian Soviet Socialist Republic. He also served as the chairman of the Council of Ministers of the Byelorussian Soviet Socialist Republic from 28 June 1938 to 28 June 1940. He was born in the Mogilev Governorate and died in Minsk.

External links 
 (Russian) Kuzma Kiselyov Biography

1903 births
1977 deaths
People from Cherikovsky Uyezd
Voronezh State University alumni
Heads of government of the Byelorussian Soviet Socialist Republic
First convocation members of the Supreme Soviet of the Soviet Union
Second convocation members of the Supreme Soviet of the Soviet Union
Third convocation members of the Supreme Soviet of the Soviet Union
Fourth convocation members of the Supreme Soviet of the Soviet Union
Members of the Central Committee of the Communist Party of Byelorussia
Members of the Supreme Soviet of the Byelorussian SSR (1938–1946)
Members of the Supreme Soviet of the Byelorussian SSR (1947–1950)
Members of the Supreme Soviet of the Byelorussian SSR (1951–1954)
Members of the Supreme Soviet of the Byelorussian SSR (1955–1959)
Members of the Supreme Soviet of the Byelorussian SSR (1959–1962)
Members of the Supreme Soviet of the Byelorussian SSR (1962–1966)
People's commissars and ministers of the Byelorussian Soviet Socialist Republic
Recipients of the Order of Lenin
Recipients of the Order of the Red Banner of Labour
Belarusian diplomats
Soviet diplomats